Barão de Melgaço is a municipality in the state of Mato Grosso in the Central-West Region of Brazil.

The municipality contains 43% of the  Encontro das Águas State Park, created in 2004.

See also
List of municipalities in Mato Grosso

External links
Pantanal Escapes - Travel Guide and tourist information for Barão de Melgaço and region

References

Municipalities in Mato Grosso